Muhammad Ali and Cleveland Williams fought each other in a boxing match at the Astrodome in  Houston, Texas on November 14, 1966. Ali won the bout through a technical knockout in the third round. Many experts and boxers, including Mike Tyson, regard Ali's performance in this fight to be the finest of his boxing career. This was also the fight in which Ali made famous the move he called the "Ali shuffle".

Background
On the evening of November 29, 1964, 2 years before the fight, Williams was shot in the stomach by a highway patrolman, for supposedly resisting arrest. The .357 magnum bullet moved across his intestines and lodged in his right hip, doing immense damage to his colon and right kidney. He underwent four operations over the next 7 months which resulted in the eventual removal of his right kidney and a loss of 60 pounds, which he later recovered by doing weight-lifting. Williams later said that "I died three times on that operating table." The bullet left vestigial damage: a partial paralysis of some hip muscles and a severely weakened right hip joint. Despite this incident, Williams returned to the ring in 1966 and won four consecutive fights before facing Ali.

In heavy contrast to Williams, Ali came into this fight in peak physical shape. He successfully defended his WBC,  NYSAC and The Ring heavyweight titles against Karl Mildenberger of Germany on September 10, 1966, after also beating 5 heavyweight contenders, including Henry Cooper, Floyd Patterson and Sonny Liston, in the years prior. By the time of the Williams fight, Ali had great success with his "stick and move" style: employing a strong left jab, to whittle down his opponents, and a low guard, allowing him to anticipate and dodge incoming punches. Ali's 2-year dominance in the heavyweight division made him a 5 to 1 favorite going into this fight.

References

Williams
1966 in boxing
World Boxing Association heavyweight championship matches
World Boxing Council heavyweight championship matches
November 1966 sports events in the United States
Boxing in Texas
Boxing in Houston
1966 in sports in Texas